John Lister may refer to:
John Lister (Australian politician) (1875–1935), member Australian House of Representatives
John Lister (gold miner), 19th century New South Wales gold miner, see 1851 in Australia
John Lister (priest) (1916–2006), Anglican Provost of Wakefield Cathedral
John Lister (golfer) (born 1947), New Zealand professional golfer
John Lister (academic), lecturer in journalism at Coventry University and investigative journalist specializing in health and hospitals
John Lister (cricketer) (born 1959), cricketer 

John Lister, co-organizer of UK's Workers' Socialist League
John Lister (philanthropist) (1847–1933), first treasurer of the British Independent Labour Party
John Lister (died 1640) (1587–1640), English merchant and politician
John Lister (died 1616), English lead merchant and politician
John Lister (American football), American football coach